Darnius is a municipality in the comarca of the Alt Empordà in Girona, Catalonia, Spain. The first document where is related Darnius was dated in 983, and the written name was Darnicibus. Until the beginning of the 20th century, the main economic activity was the manufacturing of the cork.

Interesting places
 Dòlmen del Mas Puig de Caneres (Megalithic monument)
 Església de Santa Maria
 Ermita de Sant Esteve del Llop
 Castell de Mont-roig
 Pantà de Darnius/Boadella (Reservoir)

References

External links 
Official website
 Government data pages 

Municipalities in Alt Empordà
Populated places in Alt Empordà